Paolo Micolini (2 December 1938 – 21 October 2016) was an Italian politician. He served a partial term in the Chamber of Deputies and was twice elected to the Senate. 

Micolini died at home in Scodovacca in 2016, aged 77.

References

1938 births
2016 deaths
People from Cervignano del Friuli
Christian Democracy (Italy) politicians
Italian People's Party (1994) politicians
Deputies of Legislature IX of Italy
Senators of Legislature X of Italy
Senators of Legislature XI of Italy
Politicians of Friuli-Venezia Giulia